Nuel (also Romanized as Nū'el) is a village in Sharvineh Rural District, Kalashi District, Javanrud County, Kermanshah Province, Iran. At the 2006 census, its population was 20, in 5 families.

References 

Populated places in Javanrud County